Nix Festes is a German television series that premieres on February 27, 2018 on ZDFneo.

Plot
A flat share in one of the last not yet gentrified old buildings in Berlin-Kreuzberg has to deal with the ups and downs of life. All are in a kind of limbo of life, in which it does not want to work in a bourgeois way neither with the love nor the profession. But neither the authors' colleagues and ex-lovers Wiebke (Josefine Preuss) and Jonas (Sebastian Fräsdorf) nor their friends, student Jenny (Marie Rathscheck) and cook Basti (Tim Kalkhof), can be so easily diverted from their personal life. And if all else fails, Lennart (Dirk Martens), the owner of her favorite café, will surely be in the know.

Episodes
The first season in 2018 had four episodes, followed by eight in 2021.

Background
Originally, the series should start on February 20, 2018 on ZDFneo, but it was decided to postpone it to February 27, 2018. Since on 20 February the Champions League match between FC Bayern München and Besiktas Istanbul is running on ZDF, the new series will probably be taken out of the line of fire.

See also
List of German television series

References

External links

2018 German television series debuts
German-language television shows
ZDFneo original programming
Films set in Berlin
Television shows set in Berlin
German LGBT-related television shows